Fuscão Preto is a 1983 Brazilian adventure drama film, written Francisco de Assis and directed by Jeremias Moreira Filho. The film is based on the song "Fuscão Preto" by Atílio Versutti and Mariel and sung by Almir Rogério, was filmed in the cities of Mogi Guaçu, Mogi Mirim and Espírito Santo do Pinhal, all country towns in the state of São Paulo, Brazil.

The song was released between the years of 1981/1982 and had success with the population of the time, reaching its highest success.

Synopsis
Love story of a car for a young girl. The action takes place in a country town where the Mayor forces the marriage of his son with the young woman. But the car, the "Fuscão Preto" of the title, a black Volkswagen Beetle, won't let it happen.

Elenco
 Almir Rogério as Lima
 Xuxa Meneghel as Diana
 Monique Lafond as Cleide
 Dênis Derkian as Marcelo
 Dionísio Azevedo as Lucena
 Mário Benvenutti as Rui
 Zé Coqueiro
 Dalmo Peres
 Sueli Aoki
 Florinda Lopez
 Jaci Ferreira
 Márcia Cheroto
 Janete Santos
 Mogiano & Mogianinho
 Juarez Fagundes
 Marcos Pontes
 Sérgio Águia Chileno
 Nelson Pereira
 Márcia Aoki

References

External links
 

1983 films
Brazilian adventure drama films
1980s adventure drama films
Films shot in São Paulo
1980s Portuguese-language films
1983 drama films
Volkswagen Beetle